Donald Bruce Stewart (November 14, 1935January 9, 2006) was an American actor best known for his long-running role as attorney Mike Bauer on Guiding Light.  Stewart appeared on Guiding Light from 1968 to 1984, with a brief return appearance in 1997.

Early life 
Although born in New York, New York, Stewart spent his youth in Norfolk, Nebraska.  He served six years as a pilot in the United States Air Force for which he was highly decorated.  He later served in the U.S. Navy and U.S. Naval Reserve.

Acting career 
Stewart studied opera in New York City and landed a job as an understudy to Robert Goulet in the Broadway production of Camelot.  After landing the role of Mike Bauer on Guiding Light, Stewart continued to perform in musical theater and nightclubs, including the 1964 production of Babes in the Wood. Prior to Guiding Light, he appeared on numerous episodes of the 1960s television series Dragnet.

After leaving the Guiding Light, Stewart relocated to California, where he made guest appearances in a number of television series, including L.A. Law, Highway to Heaven, Beverly Hills: 90210, and Knots Landing.  He also provided the voice of Clem in the 1991 film Rover Dangerfield.  His final public appearance was in a 2001 episode of JAG.

Death 
Stewart died of lung cancer in Santa Barbara, California at age 70. He had previously been diagnosed with aplastic anemia of unknown cause, which limited his treatment options. He was survived by his two daughters, Dr. Heather-Michelle Stewart and Genevra Stewart.

Filmography

External links

Soap opera actor Don Stewart dead at 70

1935 births
2006 deaths
American male soap opera actors
American male television actors
Deaths from lung cancer in California
People from Staten Island
People from Norfolk, Nebraska
United States Air Force officers
United States Navy officers
20th-century American male actors